Andrew Epstein (born January 14, 1996) is an American former college soccer player who last played for Stanford University. Epstein won the 2016 NCAA Division I Men's Soccer Tournament Most Outstanding Player Defensive MVP Award when the program won the 2016 NCAA Division I Men's Soccer Championship Game. He majored in Electrical Engineering, and was known for his strong efforts on group projects.

Career

Youth and college 
Epstein played for the Colorado Rapids youth academy prior to his collegiate career. Epstein played four years of college soccer for Stanford University. He was the program's starter for his sophomore through senior years, in which they won the 2015 and 2016 national titles. He finished with 65 appearances for Stanford.

During his senior year he earned several regional and national accolades, including being named to the Pac-12 first team.

Senior 
Epstein spent the 2016 PDL season playing with San Francisco City. He made four appearances with the team.

Personal life 
After retiring from the game, Epstein began serving in the Peace Corps, specifically in the rural locality of Sinendé, Benin. His mission began in September 2017 and will end in September 2019.

Epstein was known for his strong work in Electrical Engineering, especially on group projects in the grueling Green Electronics class taught by Bill Dally, even though it coincided with the 2016 NCAA Division I Men's Soccer Championship Game. After retiring from the peace corps, he became a professional electrical engineer.

Honors 
 NCAA College Cup Defensive MVP: 2016
 NSCAA Scholar First Team All-American: 2016
 NSCAA Second Team All-American: 2016
 CoSIDA First Team Academic All-American: 2016
 TopDrawerSoccer.com Best XI: 2016
 Pac-12 Best XI: 2016
 Pac-12 Second Team: 2014, 2015

References

External links
 
 
 Andrew Epstein at Stanford Athletics
 

1994 births
Living people
American expatriates in Benin
American soccer players
Association football goalkeepers
Engineers from Colorado
Expatriate footballers in Benin
Jewish American sportspeople
Jewish footballers
NCAA Division I Men's Soccer Tournament Most Outstanding Player winners
Peace Corps volunteers
People from Fort Collins, Colorado
San Francisco City FC players
Soccer players from Colorado
Stanford Cardinal men's soccer players
USL League Two players
21st-century American Jews